James Wesley Bryan (March 11, 1874 – August 26, 1956) was a U.S. Representative from Washington state.

Born in Lake Charles in  Calcasieu Parish, Louisiana, Bryan attended the public schools and Lake Charles College, later McNeese State University. He graduated in 1895 from Baylor University in Waco, Texas, and from Yale University in New Haven, Connecticut, in 1897. He studied law and was admitted to the bar in 1898 and commenced practice at Lake Charles. In 1905, he relocated to Bremerton, Washington, to continue his law practice. He was the Bremerton city attorney in 1907, 1908, and again in 1911. He served in the Washington State Senate from 1908 to 1912.

Bryan was elected as a Progressive to the Sixty-third Congress (March 4, 1913 – March 3, 1915). He was an unsuccessful candidate for renomination in 1914 to the Sixty-fourth Congress.
He owned and published the Navy Yard American from 1915 to 1917. After resuming his law practice, he was prosecuting attorney of Kitsap County, Washington, from 1926 to 1930. From 1933 to 1936, he was the president of the Bremerton Port Commission. He practiced law in Bremerton until his death there on August 26, 1956. He is interred there in Forest Lawn Cemetery.

Sources

1874 births
1956 deaths
Politicians from Lake Charles, Louisiana
Progressive Party (1912) members of the United States House of Representatives from Washington (state)
Washington (state) state senators
People from Bremerton, Washington
McNeese State University alumni
Baylor University alumni
Yale University alumni
Burials in Washington (state)
20th-century American politicians